The 2018–19 season was the 104th season of the Isthmian League, which is an English football competition featuring semi-professional and amateur clubs from London, East and South East England. This was also the first season to consist of four divisions after the league reorganised the former South Division into the new South Central and South East divisions. The league was also known as the Bostik League under a sponsorship deal with Bostik.

Premier Division

At the end of the previous season a new step 3 division was created under the Southern Football League, while number of clubs in the Premier divisions were reduced to 22 for this season. The Premier Division consisted of 22 clubs: 13 clubs from the previous season, and nine new clubs.
Promoted from the North Division:
Hornchurch
Haringey Borough
Potters Bar Town

Promoted from the South Division:
Carshalton Athletic
Corinthian-Casuals
Lewes

Transferred from the Southern League Premier Division:
Bishop's Stortford

Relegated from the National League South:
Bognor Regis Town
Whitehawk

League table

Top scorers

Play-offs

Semi-finals

Final

Super final

Results table

Stadia and locations

North Division

North Division consisted of 20 clubs: 16 clubs from the previous season, and four new clubs:
Promoted from the Eastern Counties League:
Coggeshall Town
Felixstowe & Walton United

Promoted from the Essex Senior League:
Basildon United
Great Wakering Rovers

League table

Top scorers

Play-offs

Semi-finals

Final

Results table

Stadia and locations

South Central Division

At the end of the previous season seventh step 4 division was created under the Isthmian League, as the South Division clubs were distributed between new South East and South Central divisions. Number of clubs in the step 4 divisions were reduced to 20 for the next season.
The following teams were allocated to the South Central Division.

Remained from the South Division:
Chipstead
Molesey
South Park

Transferred from the North Division:
Cheshunt
Hertford Town
Waltham Abbey
Ware

Promoted from the Combined Counties League:
Bedfont Sports
Westfield

Transferred from the Southern League Division One East:
Ashford Town
Chalfont St Peter
Egham Town
Hanwell Town
Hayes & Yeading United
Marlow
Northwood
Uxbridge

Plus:
Bracknell Town, promoted from the Hellenic League
FC Romania, promoted from the Essex Senior League
Tooting & Mitcham United, relegated from the Premier Division

League table

Top scorers

Play-offs

Semi-finals

Final

Results table

Stadia and locations

South East Division

At the end of the previous season seventh step 4 division was created under the Isthmian League, as the South Division clubs were distributed between new South East and South Central divisions. Number of clubs in the step 4 divisions were reduced to 20 for the next season. South East Division consisted of 20 clubs: 16 clubs from the previous season South Division, and four new clubs:
Promoted from the Southern Combination League:
Haywards Heath Town
Three Bridges

Promoted from the Southern Counties East League:
Sevenoaks Town
Whitstable Town

League table

Top scorers

Play-offs

Semi-finals

Final

Results table

Stadia and locations

Step 4 play-off winners rating

League Cup

The 2018–19 Alan Turvey Trophy (formerly the Isthmian League Cup) was the 45th season of the Alan Turvey Trophy, the cup competition of the whole Isthmian League.

Calendar

The Isthmian League Cup was voluntary this season. Five clubs decided not to take part in the competition:
Brightlingsea Regent
Cray Wanderers
Dereham Town
Guernsey
Lewes

Preliminary round
Twenty-six clubs participated in the Preliminary round, while fifty-one clubs received a bye to the First round.

First round
Thirteen clubs to have made it through the Preliminary round were entered into the draw with fifty-one clubs who get a bye, making sixty-four clubs.

Second round

Third round

Quarter-finals

Semi-finals

Final

See also
Isthmian League
2018–19 Northern Premier League
2018–19 Southern Football League

References

External links
Official website

2018-19
7